Post Bellum is a Czech educational nonprofit organization based in Prague. The organization was formed in 2001 by a group of historians and journalists with the aim of increasing public knowledge of the 20th century history of the Czech Republic and neighboring countries, especially among younger generations. Post Bellum has collected thousands of witness accounts by conducting interviews with people who lived through significant periods in history as part of their documentation project, Stories of the 20th Century, and for their online archive, Memory of Nations. They organize various other projects and activities to raise awareness of modern history. The stated aim of the organisation is to "understand the past through authentic testimony". Post Bellum is an associate member organization of the Platform of European Memory and Conscience.

Memory of Nations 
The organisation has created an archive of oral historical testimony entitled Memory of Nations, in partnership with the Institute for the Study of Totalitarian Regimes and Czech Radio. The archive is the largest online collection of testimonies in Central Europe, documenting the stories of "war veterans, Holocaust survivors, political prisoners, as well as members of the Communist Party, the Secret Police, and the People’s Militias". Witnesses are interviewed in their original language, then translated into English. The interviews are then archived online, where they can be browsed using different categories, dates, places, and so on, in order to locate anecdotes and interviews regarding specific events. Initially, Czech Radio provided the technical support to carry out the interviews and witness recordings, and the organisation later began using Eye Direct technology to record the testimonies. As of July 2018, there are 8281 witnesses in the database and 4499 published witnesses, as well as over 60,000 images. Notable people who have provided testimony for the database include Zdeňka Deitchová, Augustin Bubník, Václav Havel, Helga Hošková-Weissová, Milan Knížák, František Zahrádka, Felix Kolmer, and Rudolf Bereza.

Post Bellum also developed an app, Memory of Nations Sites, with an interactive map allowing users to access archive materials from the 20th century related to their current location. The app is available in English and Czech, and won the Vodafone Foundation Prize in 2012 for the "Best Application Idea."

The Memory of Nations Awards 
The Memory of Nations Award is awarded to five recipients each year, since 2010, in recognition of bravery in standing up to totalitarian regimes. Recipients are chosen from among 20 nominees by a panel of judges from the fields of historical research, journalism, and politics. The ceremony takes place each year on 17 November, the anniversary of the beginning of the Velvet Revolution, and is broadcast live on television. Each year, the award ceremony has a different theme. In November 2014, the award was presented to people involved in resistance to the Iron Curtain in the Czech Republic, Slovakia, Hungary, Poland and Germany, to commemorate the 25th anniversary of the fall of communism in Europe.

The Run for Memory of Nations 
The Run for Memory of Nations is an annual long-distance run organised to remember and honour Holocaust victims, political prisoners, veterans, and dissidents.

Stories from the 20th Century
Stories from the 20th Century is a radio show telling witnesses' stories from Post Bellum's Memory of Nations archive, that has aired every Sunday since 2006 on Czech Radio. The people interviewed include war veterans, Holocaust survivors, political prisoners of Nazi and Communist times, and members of minority groups.

Stories from the 20th Century was also the name of a documentary series that aired on Czech Television, focused on life during Normalization. The series featured interviews with StB agents, miners, members of the Communist party, gay people, and black market currency dealers.

Educational initiatives 

Post Bellum is involved with a number of initiatives aimed at increasing public knowledge of totalitarian regimes, especially among young people. They use witness testimonies as part of workshops in schools in which students are encouraged to think critically about historical events, as well as "Experience Workshops", which involve immersion in historical events and students participating in role plays of events from the mid-1900s and the Normalization period.

Another educational initiative is "Our Neighbors’ Stories", a program in which students record witness testimonies locally, which are then retold through radio or TV. Students also carry out research into the witnesses' situations which is presented together with the testimony.

Post Bellum has also published a number of educational books such as We Are Still At War and Forced Labour, graphic novels based on true stories of people affected by totalitarian regimes.

Other activities 

Post Bellum has also documented witnesses in other parts of the world, such as the United States, Poland, and Israel. They have partnerships with the Visegrad Fund and the German Foundation Remembrance, Responsibility and Future (EVZ) to record witness testimonies, and have also begun a partnership with Florida International University to document the testimonies of Cuban dissidents.

Post Bellum has put on about 128 exhibitions all around Europe. In May–July 2012, they built a replica of Mauthausen-Gusen concentration camp in Charles Square in Prague as part of an exhibition to commemorate the 70th anniversary of the assassination of Reinhard Heydrich.

References

External links
Iron Curtain Stories
Memory of Nations archive
Post Bellum website
Czech Radio
Institute for the Study of Totalitarian Regimes

Non-profit organizations based in the Czech Republic
Oral history
Commemoration of communist crimes
Platform of European Memory and Conscience
Organizations based in Prague
2001 establishments in the Czech Republic